This is a list of notable shrimp dishes. It includes dishes that use shrimp as a primary ingredient. Many various dishes are prepared using shrimp.

Shrimp dishes

Unsorted
 Drunken shrimp
 Karides güveç
 Prawn Rougaille
 Prawn soup
 Shrimp in fish sauce

See also
 Fried shrimp: various kinds of fried shrimp
List of seafood dishes
 Lists of prepared foods

References

 
Shrimp